In mathematical modeling, deterministic simulations contain no random variables and no degree of randomness, and consist mostly of equations, for example difference equations.  These simulations have known inputs and they result in a unique set of outputs. Contrast stochastic (probability) simulation, which includes random variables.

Deterministic simulation models are usually designed to capture some underlying mechanism or natural process. They are different from statistical models (for example linear regression) whose aim is to empirically estimate the relationships between variables. The deterministic model is viewed as a useful approximation of reality that is easier to build and interpret than a stochastic model. However, such models can be extremely complicated with large numbers of inputs and outputs, and therefore are often noninvertible; a fixed single set of outputs can be generated by multiple sets of inputs. Thus taking reliable account of parameter and model uncertainty is crucial, perhaps even more so than for standard statistical models, yet this is an area that has received little attention from statisticians.

Use of simulations

Deterministic simulations in scientific research are used in various studies about population fields, climate development, and pollution, engineering, chemistry and policy-making. Deterministic simulations have received attention in statistical literature under the general topic of computer experiments. Computer experiments simulate complex system which requires a number of inputs. Use of a stochastic system is much cheaper but also inaccurate and simplifying.

Model translation

It is necessary to translate models into computer recognizable formats. The modeler must decide if whether to program the model in a simulation language such as GPSS/H or to use special purpose simulation software:

Arena – discrete event simulator has also academic version

CSIM – CSIM is a re-usable general purpose discrete-event simulation environment for modeling complex systems of interacting elements. It contains hierarchical block diagram tools and extensive model libraries covering several domains. CSIM can be used for modeling: agent-based systems, logistics, wireless networks, computer networks...

Dynare – when the framework is deterministic, can be used for models with the assumption of perfect foresight. The purpose of the simulation is to describe the reaction in anticipation of, then in reaction to the shock, until the system returns to the old or to a new state of equilibrium.

Janus – Janus is an interactive simulation war game portraying realistic events during multi-sided combat. It uses digitized terrain effecting line of sight and movement, depicting contour lines, roads, rivers, vegetation and urban areas. It has the capability to be networked with other systems, in order to simulate a war game with multiple sides.

Modsaf (Modular Semi-Automated Forces) is a set of software modules and applications used to construct Advanced Distributed Simulation (ADS) and Computer Generated Forces (CGF) applications. ModSAF modules and applications let a single operator create and control large numbers of entities that are used for realistic training, test, and evaluation on the virtual battlefield. ModSAF contains entities that are sufficiently realistic resulting in the user not being aware that the displayed vehicles are being maneuvered by computers, rather than human crews. These entities, which include ground and air vehicles, dismounted infantry (DI), missiles, and dynamic structures, can interact with each other and with manned individual entity simulators to support training, combat development experiments, and test of evaluation studies.

Taylor Enterprise Dynamics is an objectoriented software system used to model, simulate, visualize, and monitor dynamic-flow process activities and systems. With Taylor ED’s open architecture, software users can access standard libraries of atoms to build models. Atoms are Taylor ED’s smart objects  and model building resources. In addition to Taylor ED’s standard atom libraries, users can create new atoms themselves.

Example of deterministic simulations

Performance evaluation of highly concurrent computers B. Kumar and E. S. Davidson Object of the simulation is CPU memory subsystem IBM 360/91.

Simulation is presented as a practical technique for performance evaluation of alternative configurations of highly concurrent computers. A technique is described for constructing a detailed deterministic simulation model of a system. In the model a control stream replaces the instruction and data streams of the real system. Simulation of the system model yields the timing and resource usage statistics needed for performance evaluation, without the necessity of emulating the system. As a case study, the implementation of a simulator of a model of the CPUmemory subsystem of the IBM 360/91 is described.

A comparison of deterministic vs stochastic simulation models for assessing adaptive information management techniques over disadvantaged tactical communication networks – Dr. Allan Gibb Mr. Jean-Claude St-Jacques

Use of a deterministic battlefield model based on a scripted scenario will provide the required
reproducibility and full control over event sequencing. A stochastic battlefield model, as provided in computer simulation applications like JANUS and ModSAF, produces results that can be made strictly reproducible if the same random number seed can be employed. However, such a model will not provide full human control over scenario composition and event sequencing. A deterministic battlefield model offers clear advantages for the test bed studies.

See also
Stochastic simulation
Systems simulation
Determinism
Dynamical system
Dynamical systems theory
System dynamics
Systems theory

References

External links
 Adrian Raftery: Research on Deterministic Simulation Models

Determinism
Mathematical modeling